This is a complete list of the 2,055 cities and towns in Germany (as of 1 March 2022). There is no distinction between town and city in Germany; a Stadt is an independent municipality (see Municipalities of Germany) that has been given the right to use that title. In contrast, the generally smaller German municipalities that do not use this title, and are thus not included here, are usually just called Gemeinden. Historically, the title Stadt was associated with town privileges, but today it is a mere honorific title. The title can be bestowed to a municipality by its respective state government and is generally given to such municipalities that have either had historic town rights or have attained considerable size and importance more recently. Towns with over 100,000 inhabitants are called Großstadt, a statistical notion sometimes translated as "city", but having no effect on their administrative status. In this list, only the cities' and towns' names are given. For more restricted lists with more details, see:
 List of cities in Germany by population (only Großstädte, i.e. cities over 100,000 population)
 Metropolitan Regions in Germany

Numbers of cities and towns in the German states:

 Bavaria: 317 cities and towns
 Baden-Württemberg: 315 cities and towns
 North Rhine-Westphalia: 272 cities and towns
 Hesse: 191 cities and towns
 Saxony: 169 cities and towns
 Lower Saxony: 159 cities and towns
 Rhineland-Palatinate: 130 cities and towns
 Thuringia: 117 cities and towns
 Brandenburg: 113 cities and towns
 Saxony-Anhalt: 104 cities and towns
 Mecklenburg-Western Pomerania: 84 cities and towns, see list
 Schleswig-Holstein: 63 cities and towns
 Saarland: 17 cities and towns
 Bremen: 2 cities
 Berlin: 1 city
 Hamburg: 1 city

A

B

C

D

E

F

G

H

I

J

K

L

M

N

O

P

Q

R

S

T

U

V

W

X

Z